Tatiana Pushnova (born March 12, 1978) is a Ukrainian reporter, editor and producer. She is chief editor of "Television News Service" and General Producer of Ukraine Today since August 2014.

Biography 
Pushnova was born March 12, 1978, in the city of Kherson. She graduated from the National University of "Kyiv-Mohyla Academy".

She started working at 5 Kanal as a reporter covering in particular the military conflict in Georgia in August 2008. She was involved in the creation of and released the news on TVi. Since 2010 she has been working at the Ukrainian channel 1+1. During this time she created the first Ukrainian TV tabloid TSN.Osoblyve and from September 2011 she has headed the powerful version of "Television News Service" on Channel 1+1.

Since August 24, 2014, she is the general producer of Ukraine Today

References

External links 
 Ukraine challenges Russian media with launch of international news channel Ukraine Today
 Ukraine Today launches app for LG Smart TV
 Ukraine Today expands in Italy
 De mediaoorlog tussen Rusland en Oekraïne: moddergevecht zonder einde

1978 births
Living people
Ukrainian television journalists
5 Kanal people
National University of Kyiv-Mohyla Academy alumni